is a monthly shōjo manga magazine published by Kodansha in Japan. First issued in December 1954, it is a long-running magazine with over 60 years of manga publication history. Notable titles serialized in Nakayoshi include Princess Knight, Candy Candy, Pretty Guardian Sailor Moon and Cardcaptor Sakura. Roughly the size of a phone book (hence the term "phone book manga"), the magazine generally comes with furoku, or small gifts, such as pop-out figures, games, small bags, posters, stickers, and so on. The furoku is an attempt to encourage girls to buy their own copies of the magazine rather than just share with a friend.

It is one of the best-selling shōjo manga magazines, having sold over 400million copies since 1978. In the mid-1990s, Nakayoshi retailed for 400 yen and had an average of 448 pages. The estimated average circulation of Nakayoshi at this time was 1,800,000. Its circulation peaked at 2,100,000 in 1993. In 2007, its circulation was 400,000. During the 1990s, then editor-in-chief, Yoshio Irie attempted to move the magazine away from "first love" stories and introduced several fantasy manga such as Sailor Moon. During that period, Nakayoshi pursued a "media-mix" campaign, which involved close coordination of the magazine, anime productions based on the manga, and character merchandising. Nakayoshi is also published on the 6th of each month.

Serializations

Current
 Cardcaptor Sakura: Clear Card (2016–present)
 Delicious Party Pretty Cure (2022–present)
 Mermaid Melody Pichi Pichi Pitch Aqua (2021-present)

Past

1954–1979
 Princess Knight (1958)
 Angel's Hill (1960–1961)
 Sarutobi Ecchan (1971)
 Candy Candy (1975–1979)
 Ohayō! Spank (1979–1982)

1980–1989
 Aoi-chan Panic! (1983–1984)
 Attacker You! (1984–1985)
 Anmitsu Hime (1986–1987)
 Goldfish Warning! (1989–1993)

1990–1999
 Pretty Guardian Sailor Moon (1991–1997)
 Miracle Girls (1991–1994)
 Azuki-chan (1993–1997)
 Magic Knight Rayearth (1993–1996)
 Saint Tail (1995–1996)
 Cardcaptor Sakura (1996–2000)
 Delicious! (1996–1999)
 Dream Saga (1997–1999)
 Yume no Crayon Oukoku (1997–1998)
 Cyber Team in Akihabara: PataPi (1998)
 UFO Baby (1998–2002)
 Ghost Hunt (1998–2010)
 Super Doll Licca-chan (1998–1999)

2000–2009

 Ojamajo Doremi (2000)
 Ultra Cute (2000–2003)
 Tokyo Mew Mew (2000–2003)
 Zodiac P.I. (2001–2003)
 Mōtto! Ojamajo Doremi (2001)
 Instant Teen: Just Add Nuts (2001–2002)
 Musume Monogatari: Morning Musume Official Story (2001–2004)
 Shin Dā! Dā! Dā! (2002)
 Mermaid Melody Pichi Pichi Pitch (2002–2005)
 Mamotte! Lollipop (2002–2005)
 Koinu Dan no Monogatari (2002)
 Kamichama Karin (2003–2005)
 Ashita no Nadja (2003)
 Futari wa Pretty Cure (2004–2005)
 Futari wa Pretty Cure Max Heart (2005–2006)
 Cherry Juice (2004–2006)
 Pixie Pop (2004–2005)
 Kitchen Princess (2004–2008)
 Sugar Sugar Rune (2004–2007)
 Kedamono Damono (2004-2007)
 Hell Girl (2005–2008)
 Shugo Chara! (2005–2010)
 Futari wa Pretty Cure Splash Star (2006–2007)
 Modotte! Mamotte! Lollipop (2006–2007)
 Okko's Inn (2006–2012)
 Kamichama Karin Chu (2007–2008)
 Yes! PreCure 5 (2007–2008)
 Yes! PreCure 5 GoGo! (2008–2009)
 I Am Here! (2007–2009)
 Shugo Chara-chan! (2008–2010)
 Fresh Pretty Cure! (2009–2010)
 Arisa (2009–2012)
 New Hell Girl (2009)
 Missions of Love (2009–2012)

2010–2019
 HeartCatch PreCure! (2010–2011)
 Shugo Chara! Encore! (2010)
 Hell Girl R (2010–2013)
 Sabagebu! (2010–2016)
 Suite PreCure (2011–2012)
 Smile PreCure! (2012–2013)
 DokiDoki! PreCure (2013–2014)
 HappinessCharge PreCure! (2014–2015)
 Fairy Tail: Blue Mistral (2014–2015)
 Stella: Nana and the Magic English Words (2014-2016)
 Go! Princess PreCure (2015–2016)
 Hōzuki no Reitetsu: Shiro no Ashiato (2015–2020)
 Witchy PreCure! (2016–2017)
 Kirakira Pretty Cure a la Mode (2017–2018)
 Hug! Pretty Cure (2018–2019)
 Star Twinkle PreCure (2019–2020)
 Bacteria at Work! (2017–2020)

2020–
 Healin' Good Pretty Cure (2020–2021)
 Tropical-Rouge! Pretty Cure (2021–2022)

Circulation

International versions
An Indonesian language version, Nakayoshi: Gress!, is published monthly by Elex Media Komputindo in Indonesia. The series has been canceled effectively in January 2017.

Related magazines
 Bessatsu Friend
 Shōjo Friend (defunct)

References

External links
 Digi Naka Official Site 
 An Incomplete List of Kodansha Comic's Nakayoshi Works (By Artist) 

1954 establishments in Japan
Kodansha magazines
Magazines established in 1954
Magazines published in Tokyo
Monthly manga magazines published in Japan
Shōjo manga magazines